Duane Henry (born 18 March 1985) is an English actor. Henry is most notable for his work on NCIS, Doctors, and W.E. He currently resides in Los Angeles, California.

Early life 
Duane Henry was born in Birmingham, West Midlands, England. He grew up in a working class home in Handsworth. As a child, Henry attended St. Francis Catholic Primary School in Birmingham, and St. John Wall School in Handsworth, eventually studying drama at Dudley College. When he was 17, Henry moved to London to explore a career in the entertainment industry.

Career 
Henry first began acting in 2004, a year after moving to London on November 27, 2003. His first acting role was alongside Samantha Janus on The Afternoon Play, a British television anthology series. From 2004 to 2011, Henry made a variety of guest appearances on popular British television dramas, including Doctor Who, The Bill, and The Cut, earning him a nomination for the British Academy of Film and Television Arts (BAFTA) Screen National Award for Best Emerging Talent in 2010.

From 2005 to 2013, Henry played five roles on the British medical soap opera Doctors, originally set in Birmingham. He played Gareth Broadhurst, a former soldier with PTSD in a three-part special of the show released in 2013 entitled Doctors: War Zone.  Henry attributes his success on Doctors to the fact that he is a native of Birmingham and is therefore automatically considered for roles on the show. Then, in 2011, Henry played a security guard in Madonna’s historical romance drama W.E.

Henry moved from London to Los Angeles in November 2013.  Shortly after moving to Los Angeles, Henry spent a year perfecting his American accent in order to expand his range as an actor. He auditioned for many roles, including a role on Jennifer Lopez's Shades of Blue, where Barry Levinson of Rain Man was also present.

Henry first joined the NCIS cast as MI6 agent Clayton Reeves in May 2016 for the 23rd and 24th episodes of the show’s 13th season. Henry was given an option to return for the following season. In July 2016, it was confirmed that Henry’s character would be featured as a regular on the show beginning in the 14th season, which aired on September 20, 2016. According to Henry, the character of Clayton Reeves did not originally have roots in Birmingham, but he incorporated his upbringing into his character’s backstory. Henry left NCIS in the 22nd episode of the 15th season titled "Two Steps Back" in which Reeves is killed off. Henry explained that neither he nor the producers were sure of what direction to take the character of Reeves after the death of his creator and NCIS showrunner Gary Glasberg on September 28, 2016, so the decision was made to write the character out of the show at the end of season 15.

Personal life 
Henry was homeless for a period in his lifetime, and has connected his difficult upbringing in Birmingham to his success as an actor. His mother was a 16 year-old single parent. He eventually moved in with his aunt and held various jobs including selling shoes on Oxford Street, and in a theatre in Leicester Square, where he "was sacked for daydreaming and practising his autograph." Henry did not know his father. He stated that growing up they were hit with reality, and where he grew up showed him where he does and does not want to be in life; it made him work much harder to achieve his goals.

Henry has stated that if he were not an actor, he would still be involved in the arts, perhaps teaching drama to younger generations, or as a talent scout. When asked about his inspiration as an actor, Henry replied that he reviews the struggles of people in his social circles “from A-Z” and then sees them still on their feet and smiling and draws inspiration from them to “keep on going”.

Filmography

Film

Television

References

External links
 

Living people
1985 births
21st-century British male actors
Black British male actors
British expatriate male actors in the United States
British male television actors
People from Handsworth, West Midlands